Leiarius pictus, commonly as Sailfin Pim, Painted Catfish or Saddle Catfish, is a species of demersal catfish of the family Pimelodidae that is native to Amazon, Essequibo, and Orinoco River basins of Colombia Venezuela, Peru and Brazil.

Description
Body dark brown with darker spots, with a lighter underside. Juvenile with two pale bands.

References

Pimelodidae
Catfish of South America
Fish described in 1849